ETS translocation variant 4 (ETV4), also known as polyoma enhancer activator 3 (PEA3), is a member of the PEA3 subfamily of Ets transcription factors.

Disease marker 
Two variants of a disease associated with ETV4 is Ewing Sarcoma and Extraosseous Ewing's Sarcoma. While both are cancerous tumors, the former grows in the bones most commonly affecting the arms, legs, hips, and spine, while the later affects the soft tissue in the chest, foot, pelvis and spine.

References

Further reading

External links 
 
 

Transcription factors